Lab block is the specially formulated food fed to mice and rats kept in a laboratory. It is commonly accepted as providing all the necessary nutrients in appropriate quantity in order for the animals to remain healthy. The main ingredient in most block food is typically corn, followed by soy.

Pet foods